Mapoon is a coastal town in the Aboriginal Shire of Mapoon and a locality split between the Aboriginal Shire of Mapoon and the Shire of Cook in Queensland, Australia.

History

Pre-European settlement
Teppathiggi (also known Tepithiki and Teyepathiggi) is an Australian Aboriginal language of the Western Cape York Peninusla, Middle Dulcie River, Lower Batavia River, Ducie River, and Mapoon. The language region includes areas within the local government boundaries of Cook Shire Council.

Uradhi (also known as Anggamudi, Ankamuti, Atampaya, Bawtjathi, and Lotiga) is an Australian Aboriginal language of the Western Cape York Peninsula. The traditional language region includes north of Mapoon and Duyfken Point and east of the coast strip to the north of Port Musgrave (Angkamuthi country) incorporating the mouth of the Ducie River, the lower reaches of the Dulhunty River and the upper reaches of the Skardon River in the north. Following the displacement of Indigenous people by British settlement, it was also spoken in the Northern Peninsula Area Region including the communities of New Mapoon, Injinoo and Cowal Creek.

1891: Mission
In 1891 the Moravian Church established a mission at Mapoon with the aim of providing education and health services to the Aboriginal people. It was their first mission in Cape York Peninsula and they established it at the request of the Presbyterian Church. By 1907, under the Industrial and Reformatory Schools Act 1865 (Qld) where missions were registered as schools, it was operating as a community for local people.

1950–2000
In the 1950s when bauxite was discovered on the Western Cape area, the Queensland Government  passed legislation to help the interested companies Comalco and Alcan  with the 'Comalco Act' (Commonwealth Aluminium Corporation Pty Ltd Agreement Act 1957 (Qld)). The government, together with Comalco determined to evict the residents off the mission, and they were moved forcibly by the Queensland police from Old Mapoon to New Mapoon on 15 November 1963. The closing of the Mission was explained publicly as a measure to 'rationalise services' for the Cape indigenous people by centralising them in the Bamaga area. In November 1963, people were forced from their homes by armed police. They were then transported  by ship. The police raid was ordered and overseen by Patrick Killoran, the then-director of Aboriginal Affairs in Queensland. Aboriginal residents' houses were burnt to the ground in 1963 by Queensland Police.

Many residents were unhappy at Bamaga, at one of the nearby communities now known as New Mapoon. Over the following years, many moved back to (Old) Mapoon and eventually the government provided new housing. Mapoon became known as one of the places involved in the fight for Indigenous land rights in the 1970s, and seven families had moved back by 1975. The Black Resource Centre in Melbourne, led by Cheryl Buchanan, was involved, and she also took Lionel Fogarty to meet the displaced residents.  

Mapoon State School opened on 30 January 1995.  On 1 January 2002, it became the Mapoon campus of Western Cape College.

The , the population of Mapoon was 139.

21st century
In 2000, the Mapoon Aboriginal community was formally recognised under Deed of Grant in Trust arrangements. The Mapoon Aboriginal Council administers the community affairs with government support.

Geography 
Mapoon is on the western side of Cape York Peninsula in Far North Queensland, Australia.

The town of Mapoon is on a peninsula that extends into the Gulf of Carpentaria with Cullen Point (also known as Tullanaringa Point) at its tip, creating a side bay of the Gulf called Port Musgrave, which is probably named after Sir Anthony Musgrave, the Queensland Governor from 1883 to 1888. Ducie River and Wenlock River flow though the locality into Port Musgrave.

Red Beach is a sandy strip facing Port Musgrave adjacent to the south side of the town. The government-built housing is spread out in bushland along Red Beach Road towards Cullen Point, rather than being clustered together as in other Western Cape communities. 

Flying Fox Island is a  marine island in the west of Port Musgrave close to the coastline north of the town.

During the wet season from December to April the town is largely inaccessible except by air and sea.

It is a bauxite mine. It includes the Myerfield Strip, an aircraft landing strip. The name Myerfield was proposed by Alcan Pty Ltd, which had built the airstrip.

Demography

Climate
 
Mapoon experiences a tropical savanna climate (Köppen: Aw, Trewartha: Awha), with hot conditions year-round. There is a shorter wet season from mid-November to April, and a longer dry season from May to mid-November.

Economy 
There is a fishing business, providing mudcrabs to southern markets from the Port Musgrave Bay and Dulhunty and Wenlock rivers.

Education 
Western Cape College is a primary (Early Childhood-6) school headquartered at Rocky Point, Weipa. Its campus in Mapoon is on Red Beach Road.

Facilities 
Presently the town has a primary school, nursing station, council office and small shop providing fuel and food.  Local people are employed on the Council which as well as providing services for the local community in 2006 won the contract to provide road maintenance for the all-weather  dirt road from the town of Weipa.

In cooperation between the council and the State Library of Queensland, the New Mapoon Indigenous Knowledge Centre (IKC) was opened on Thursday, 18 August 2022, within the New Mapoon Cultural Centre.  The IKC includes computers and a library connection.

Attractions 
Camping facilities near the town are found at Cullen Point and Janie Creek. The area is known for excellent fishing and crabbing.

Alcohol Management Plan 
An alcohol management plan (AMP) exists in the community, with restrictions on the amount and type of liquor that may be carried on persons or vehicles in the area. This AMP was formulated and requested by the majority of Elders within the community and passed by law by the Government of Queensland into section 168 of the Liquor Act 1992. It is enforced by the Queensland police based at Weipa.

References

Sources

External links

 
 

Mapoon oral histories 1992-2014, State Library of Queensland

Australian Aboriginal missions
Populated places in Far North Queensland
Aboriginal communities in Queensland
1963 in Australia
Shire of Cook
Aboriginal Shire of Mapoon
Coastline of Queensland
Localities in Queensland